The Hubbard Medal is awarded by the National Geographic Society for distinction in exploration, discovery, and research. The medal is named for Gardiner Greene Hubbard, first National Geographic Society president.  It is made of gold and is traditionally presented by the President of the United States.

Recipients

See also

 List of geography awards

References

Geography awards
National Geographic Society
National Geographic Society medals recipients